Tiago or Thiago Campos may refer to:
 Tiago Magalhães (born 1981), or Tiago Campos, Brazilian baseball outfielder
 Tiago Campos (swimmer) (born 1998), Portuguese marathon swimmer
 Thiago Campos (born 1984), Brazilian association football defender